Lorraine Cheshire (born 15 August 1958) is an English actress, known for her roles as Sue Benson in the Sky sitcom Trollied, Fleur Budgen in the BBC One school-based drama Waterloo Road and Lorraine Bird in the Channel 4 school-based drama series Ackley Bridge.

Filmography

Career
Cheshire made her professional acting debut in two episodes of the BBC series Cranford, portraying the role of Jo Warren. After that, she made appearances in series such as Clocking Off, Having It Off and Holby City. In 2003, Cheshire was cast in her first main role, in the BBC series Early Doors. She portrayed the role of Joan Bell for two series. From 2007 to 2012, she appeared in the BBC drama Waterloo Road in the recurring role of Fleur Budgen. Then in 2008, Cheshire starred in the BBC Three series Massive as Lorraine Finnegan. In 2009 she played mother of five Winnie Hastings in The episode ‘Should I stay or should I go now’ of The Royal. Cheshire guest starred in a series 25 episode of Casualty in 2011 as Sandra Orr, the relative of a patient. From 2011 to 2018, Cheshire starred in the Sky sitcom Trollied as customer service representative Sue Benson. She appeared in all seven series, as well as the specials. Between 2014 and 2016, Cheshire also appeared in the BBC series In the Club as Geraldine for 12 episodes. The actress appeared in a second episode of Casualty in 2015, during the show's twenty-ninth series. In this appearance, she played patient Pam Poole opposite Paul Trussell as Derek Owen. In 2017, Cheshire began portraying the role of Lorraine Bird in the Channel 4 school drama Ackley Bridge.

Personal life
Cheshire began acting at the age of 35, after her husband was made redundant from the Army. She attended the Arden Drama School in Manchester, and later joined the Manchester Actors Company.

References

External links

Living people
1958 births
People from Hulme
Actresses from Manchester
English film actresses 
English soap opera actresses